Jeffrey Koo Sr. (8 September 1933 – 6 December 2012) was a Taiwanese billionaire banker, who served as honorary chairman and governor of Chinatrust Bank, and co founded Koos Group.

Family ancestry
The rise of the Koo family dates back to the late nineteenth century in Lukang, which was the capital at the time. The first generation Koo ancestors held monopolistic investments in camphor, salt, sugar, and land.

Early years
Koo was born in 1933 in Taichū Prefecture in Japanese Taiwan. He graduated from Soochow University in Taipei in 1957 with a BA in accounting, moved to New York (lived in Brooklyn Heights) and graduated from New York University Stern School of Business in 1962 with an MBA: his youngest son Andre Koo and eldest grandson Andre Koo Jr. also attended NYU Stern as the 3rd legacy alum.

Personal life
Around the mid 20th century, Koo co-founded with his uncle, Koo Chen-fu, the Koos Group which is a conglomerate/consortium of businesses including cement, insurance, financial services, leasing, hospitality, etc. Chinatrust Financial Holding – one of the largest, esteemed, and privately owned commercial banks in Asia[4]. Jeffrey Koo Sr. was also an Eisenhower Fellowship awardee [5] and ambassador at-large representing Taiwan in cross-strait relations with China [6] and attended major international forums such as the APEC (Asia-Pacific Economic Cooperation).

Koo is survived upon his wife, daughter and three sons. The eldest being Jeffrey Koo Jr. and the youngest son being Andre Koo. Andre Koo's eldest son, Andre Koo Jr. is the heir to the family empire.

Family achievements
In 2019, Koo's youngest son Andre Koo is currently ranked as Taiwan's #28th wealthiest and #1349 world-wide at $1.7 billion.

The Koo family was ranked #47th of #50 in 2016 Asia's Richest Families Net Worth at $3.7 billion. Sources say the Koo Family in 2018 ranked behind the $5 billion Forbes Asia Richest Families net worth cutoff at $4.6 billion; short of $400 million.

In 2001, The Wall Street Journal reported total assets of the Koos Group to be US$36 billion. Today, the total assets of the Koo Family is estimated to be over US$250 billion.

Career
Koo founded what is now Chinatrust Commercial Bank in 1966. It was established under the identity of China Securities and Investment Corporation. In 1971, its name was changed to Chinatrust Investment Company Limited. In 1992, it was transformed into Chinatrust Commercial Bank.

The bank has subsidiaries in the Philippines, the United States, Canada, and Indonesia, foreign branch offices in Singapore, Hong Kong, India, Japan, and Vietnam, and foreign representative offices in London, Bangkok, Hanoi, Beijing, Manila, and Los Angeles.

CTBC Bank was awarded by international professional agencies as Best Bank in Taiwan in Asiamoney and The Asset magazines. In the area of corporate banking, CTBC Bank was recognized by Global Finance and Asiamoney as the Best Foreign Exchange Bank in Taiwan, while Global Finance, The Asset, The Asian Banker, The Corporate Treasurer, and Global Trade Review magazines named CTBC Bank Taiwan's Best Trade Finance Bank. CTBC Bank was awarded Best Retail Bank in Taiwan by The Asian Banker for the ninth time and was named Taiwan's Best Wealth Management Bank in Euromoney for the eleventh time.

Koo was named Ambassador-at-large, representing Taiwan, mainly in Cross-strait relations.

In June 2008, Forbes ranked him as the sixth richest individual in Taiwan, with a net worth of US$ 2.8 billion.

Koo is also an alumnus of Eisenhower Fellowships and a member of the Board of Trustees and a member of the APEC (Asia-Pacific Economic Cooperation).

Awards and honorary degrees
Order of the Rising Sun, Gold and Silver Star from the Japanese government, 2012.
 Honorary PhD in Business from De La Salle University in the Philippines (1989)
 Honorary Doctorate from East China Normal University, Shanghai, China (2012)

Death
Koo went to New York City for treatment for Parkinson's disease and died at the Memorial Sloan-Kettering Cancer Center on 6 December 2012.

References

Hokkien businesspeople
Taiwanese bankers
Koo family of Lukang
Taiwanese billionaires
Soochow University (Taiwan) alumni
New York University Stern School of Business alumni
People from Changhua County
1933 births
2012 deaths
Recipients of the Order of the Rising Sun, 2nd class
Deaths from Parkinson's disease
Neurological disease deaths in New York (state)
Taiwanese people of Hoklo descent
Eisenhower Fellows